Paüls is a municipality in the comarca of Baix Ebre, province of Tarragona, Catalonia, Spain.

The Montsagre de Paüls mountain range rises above the town.

References

External links 
 Pàgina web de l'Ajuntament
 Government data pages 

Municipalities in Baix Ebre
Populated places in Baix Ebre